Water polo was contested for men only at the 1990 Asian Games in Beijing, China.

Medalists

Results

Preliminary round

Group A

Group B

Classification 5th–7th
 The results and the points of the matches between the same teams that were already played during the preliminary round shall be taken into account for the classification round.

Final round

Semifinals

Bronze medal match

Final

Final standing

References
Results
Asian Games water polo medalists

 
1990 Asian Games events
1990
Asian Games
1990 Asian Games